= Manding sword =

Medieval Mandinka sword

The Manding (also Mandingo and Mandingue) sword is a Malian (Mandinka) style of sword used during the Mali Empire (1235–1610) and the following periods up into the 20th Century. Examples of the sword mainly come from Mali and Guinea. The sword is primarily made of iron, brass and wood with a leather hilt, it is known for being a single-edged curved blade, although there are also straight double-edged versions mainly used today. The blade is usually between 65 and 85 centimetres long and is able to be used with one hand. The pommels are ball shaped and the handles are usually wooden or leather.
